Mario Alfonso Velarde Pinto (born 3 July 1990) is a Peruvian professional footballer who plays as a left winger or an attacking midfielder for Deportivo Municipal.

He made his debut for Peru in a 3–0 defeat to England at Wembley Stadium on 30 May 2014.

References

1990 births
Living people
Footballers from Lima
Peruvian footballers
Peruvian expatriate footballers
Peru international footballers
Association football midfielders
Association football wingers
Ayacucho FC footballers
Cienciano footballers
Juan Aurich footballers
León de Huánuco footballers
Unión Comercio footballers
Cimarrones de Sonora players
Club Alianza Lima footballers
Sport Huancayo footballers
Deportivo Municipal footballers
Peruvian Primera División players
Liga MX players
Peruvian expatriate sportspeople in Mexico
Expatriate footballers in Mexico